Fredy Glanzmann (born 16 July 1963) is a Swiss former nordic combined skier who competed during the 1980s. He won a silver medal in the 3 x 10 km team event at the 1988 Winter Olympics in Calgary and also won a silver medal in the 3 x 10 km team event at the 1989 FIS Nordic World Ski Championships.

External links 
 
 

1963 births
Living people
Swiss male Nordic combined skiers
Nordic combined skiers at the 1988 Winter Olympics
Olympic medalists in Nordic combined
FIS Nordic World Ski Championships medalists in Nordic combined
Medalists at the 1988 Winter Olympics
Olympic silver medalists for Switzerland
Olympic Nordic combined skiers of Switzerland